Puerto Rico competed at the 2012 Summer Olympics in London, United Kingdom from July 27 to August 12, 2012. This was the nation's seventeenth consecutive appearance at the Olympics.

Comité Olímpico de Puerto Rico sent a total of 25 athletes to the Games, 19 men and 6 women, to compete in 8 sports. The nation's team size was roughly larger by three athletes from Beijing. This was also the youngest delegation in Puerto Rico's Olympic history, with half the team under the age of 25, and many of them were expected to reach their peak in time for the 2016 Olympics in Rio de Janeiro. Four Puerto Rican athletes had competed in Beijing, including track star and pre-Olympic favorite Javier Culson, who held the record as the "world's fastest man" in the hurdles, and later became the nation's flag bearer at the opening ceremony. Canterbury Christ Church University had been selected as the team's preparation base for these Olympic games.

These Games tied as Puerto Rico's most successful Olympics, winning a total of two medals, and tying the record for the most medals with Los Angeles at a single games. Javier Culson won the nation's first ever medal in the men's hurdles and their first bronze in 16 years. Meanwhile, Dominican born Jaime Espinal became the first Puerto Rican athlete to claim an Olympic silver medal in men's freestyle wrestling, and set a historic Olympic record as the nation's second silver medalist, 28 years after Luis Ortiz had become the first.

Medalists

Athletics

Puerto Rican athletes have so far achieved qualifying standards in the following athletics events (up to a maximum of 3 athletes in each event at the 'A' Standard, and 1 at the 'B' Standard):

Men

Women

Boxing

Men

Gymnastics

Artistic
Men

Women

Judo

Shooting

Men

Swimming

Puerto Rican swimmers have so far achieved qualifying standards in the 200 m freestyle and 50 m freestyle events (up to a maximum of 2 swimmers in each event at the Olympic Qualifying Time (OQT), and potentially 1 at the Olympic Selection Time (OST)) Vanessa García and Raúl Martínez, were invited directly by FINA, to participate in the 50 m freestyle and 200 m freestyle respectively.

Men

Women

Weightlifting

Lely Burgos, did not obtain the qualification for the 2012 Summer Olympics directly in the Americas Olympic Qualifying, but for her effort, she was invited directly by the International Weightlifting Federation.

Wrestling

Puerto Rico has qualified three quota places.

Men's freestyle

See also
Puerto Rico at the 2011 Pan American Games

References

External links

Nations at the 2012 Summer Olympics
2012
2012 in Puerto Rican sports